Chennah  is a state constituency in Negeri Sembilan, Malaysia, that has been represented in the Negeri Sembilan State Legislative Assembly.

The state constituency was first contested in 1995 and is mandated to return a single Assemblyman to the Negeri Sembilan State Legislative Assembly under the first-past-the-post voting system. , the State Assemblyman for Chennah is Anthony Loke Siew Fook from the Democratic Action Party (DAP), which is part of the state's ruling coalition, Pakatan Harapan.

Definition 
The Chennah constituency contains the polling districts of Kampong Sungai Buloh, Durian Tipus, Simpang Durian, Kampong Chennah, Pekan Titi, Sungai Muntoh, Kampong Seperi, Petaling and Kampong Gagu.

Demographics

Representation history

Election results

References

Negeri Sembilan state constituencies